Virginie Greiner (born September 3, 1969) is a French comic book scriptwriter who lives in Montélimar, and is affiliated with the collective of female comics creators against sexism.

Biography
Virginie Greiner was born in Saint-Germain-en-Laye, France. In 2004, she wrote a short story in the collection . Greiner frequently features heroines "whose merits are often overlooked or understated". A committed feminist, she is part of the collective of female comics creators against sexism and campaigns for gender equality in the world of bande dessinée.

The following year, she wrote the texts for a collection of collective illustrations, which received a mixed critical reception.

In collaboration with her husband, Frank Giroud, Greiner co-wrote the script for the first volume of the Secrets series (2009), drawn by Marianne Duvivier, Pâques avant les Rameaux. Both are also writers of the second volume of the Destins series (2010), with drawings by Daphné Collignon.

She took part in Delcourt's "Reines de sang" collection with the script for the diptych on Fredegund, with drawings by Alessia De Vincenzi (2014-16). Greiner resumed collaboration with Collignon to trace the youth of André Malraux and his wife Clara Malraux, based on Mrs. Malraux's autobiography: Nos vingt ans; the work is called Avant l'heure du tigre. The two authors published a biography in 2016: Tamara de Lempicka. After this work, Greiner was the guest of honor at the 28th Causons comic book festival in Cousance. Again in collaboration with Annabel, Greiner created the portrait of Isabelle Eberhardt, published in 2018. In 2019, Greiner wrote the script for Mata Hari, which offers the biography of the famous character, with drawings by Olivier Roman.

Selected works 
Unless otherwise stated, Greiner is the scriptwriter:
 Avec Crisse : Cadavres exquis, éd. Clair de Lune, 2004  
 Willow Place : Réincarnations, designed by Annabel, éd. Clair de Lune, coll. "Fantasmagorie", March 2005  
 En mâle de nus (text), collective illustrations, éd Attakus, 2006,  
 Secrets, vol. 1 : Pâques avant les Rameaux, co-written with Frank Giroud, designed by Marianne Duvivier, Dupuis coll. Empreinte(s), February 2009 
 Destins, vol. 2 : Le Fils, co-written with Frank Giroud, design and coloring by Daphné Collignon, Glénat Editions, coll. Grafica, January 2010  
 Sorcières, vol. 2 : Hypathie, designed by Christelle Pécout, Dupuis, March 2010  
 En chemin elle rencontre... Les artistes se mobilisent pour l'égalité femme-homme, by Marie Moinard and collective, Vincennes/Paris, Des ronds dans l'O/Amnesty International, February 2013 
 Les Reines de sang : Frédégonde la sanguinaire, design by Alessia De Vincenzi, Delcourt, coll. "Histoire & Histoires"
 Volume 1, October 2014  
 Volume 2, October 2016  
 Avant l'heure du Tigre, design and coloring by Daphné Collignon, Glénat, April 2015  
 Tamara de Lempicka, design and coloring by Daphné Collignon, Glénat, coll. 1000 Feuilles, November 2017  
 Isabelle Eberhardt, design by Annabel, Glénat, coll. Explora, October 2018  
 Rendez-vous avec X, vol. 3 : Mata Hari, design and coloring by Olivier Roman, Comix Buro, coll. Hors Collection, October 2019

References

1969 births
Living people
French comics writers
People from Yvelines